Lionel Stephen Edward Farris (1905-1986), was a male English international table tennis player.

He participated in the 1926 World Table Tennis Championships.

In addition, he was a beaten finalist in the 1925/26 English Championship. He won two English Open titles in the men's doubles with Percival Bromfield and the mixed doubles with Joan Ingram.

See also
 List of table tennis players
 List of World Table Tennis Championships medalists

References

English male table tennis players
1905 births
1986 deaths
Sportspeople from London
World Table Tennis Championships medalists